David John Downey (born October 28, 1941) is a former collegiate basketball player for the University of Illinois Fighting Illini basketball team. He is best known for setting the Illinois single-game scoring record with 53 points at Indiana on February 16, 1963.

Downey's 18.9 career scoring average ranks fourth in school history while his 11.0 career rebounding average ranks third, with his 790 career rebounds ranking seventh on the career list. Downey earned the 1963 Big Ten Conference Medal of Honor for excellence in both academics and athletics. He was drafted into the NBA in 1963 by the San Francisco Warriors; however, he never played a game in the league.

Downey was elected to the "Illini Men's Basketball All-Century Team" in 2004.

Downey was the leading scorer for his hometown high school, Canton High School.  His record was then broken by Kevin Rhodes.  When asked about this accomplishment, Downey simply said, "It was only a matter of time until Kevin Rhodes broke my record."

Honors

Basketball
 1961 – Team MVP

 1961 – 2nd Team All-Big Ten

 1961 – Honorable Mention All American

 1962 – Team MVP

 1962 – 2nd Team All-Big Ten

 1962 – Honorable Mention All American

 1963 – Team MVP

 1963 – 1st Team All-Big Ten

 1963 – 1st Team All American

 1963 – Big Ten Medal of Honor recipient

 1963 – NCAA All-Regional Team

 1973 – Inducted into the Illinois Basketball Coaches Association's Hall of Fame as a player.

 2004 – Elected to the "Illini Men's Basketball All-Century Team".

 2008 – Honored as one of the thirty-three honored jerseys which hang in the State Farm Center to show regard for being the most decorated basketball players in the University of Illinois' history.

 2018 – Inducted into the Illinois Athletics Hall of Fame

Statistics

References

External links
Further biography at The Downey Group, Inc.
1963 NBA Draft at basketball-reference.com

1941 births
Living people
American men's basketball players
Basketball players from Illinois
Forwards (basketball)
Illinois Fighting Illini men's basketball players
San Francisco Warriors draft picks